German submarine U-761 was a Type VIIC U-boat of Nazi Germany's Kriegsmarine during World War II.

She was ordered on 9 October 1939, and was laid down on 16 December 1940, at Kriegsmarinewerft, Wilhelmshaven, as yard number 144. She was launched on 26 September 1942, and commissioned under the command of Oberleutnant zur See Horst Geider on 3 December 1942.

Design
German Type VIIC submarines were preceded by the shorter Type VIIB submarines. U-761 had a displacement of  when at the surface and  while submerged. She had two shafts and two  propellers.

U-761 was fitted with five  torpedo tubes (four fitted at the bow and one at the stern), fourteen torpedoes or 26 TMA mines, one  SK C/35 naval gun, 220 rounds, and two twin  C/30 anti-aircraft guns. The boat had a complement of between 44 — 52 men.

Service history
U-761 participated in two war patrols that yielded no ships sunk or damaged.

Oblt.z.S. Horst Geider and 47 other crewmen, of a crew of 57, survived the attack.

Wolfpacks
U-761 took part in three wolfpacks, namely:
 Coronel (4 – 8 December 1943) 
 Coronel 1 (8 – 14 December 1943) 
 Coronel 2 (14 – 16 December 1943)

References

Bibliography

External links

German Type VIIC submarines
U-boats commissioned in 1942
World War II submarines of Germany
Ships built in Wilhelmshaven
1942 ships
U-boats scuttled in 1944
Maritime incidents in February 1944